In business and engineering, new product development (NPD) covers the complete process of bringing a new product to market, renewing an existing product or introducing a product in a new market. A central aspect of NPD is product design, along with various business considerations. New product development is described broadly as the transformation of a market opportunity into a product available for sale. The products developed by an organisation provide the means for it to generate income. For many technology-intensive firms their approach is based on exploiting technological innovation in a rapidly changing market. 

The product can be tangible (something physical which one can touch) or intangible (like a service or experience), though sometimes services and other processes are distinguished from "products". NPD requires an understanding of customer needs and wants, the competitive environment, and the nature of the market.
Cost, time, and quality are the main variables that drive customer needs. Aiming at these three variables, innovative companies develop continuous practices and strategies to better satisfy customer requirements and to increase their own market share by a regular development of new products. There are many uncertainties and challenges which companies must face throughout the process.

Process structure 
The product development process typically consists of several activities that firms employ in the complex process of delivering new products to the market. A process management approach is used to provide a structure. Product development often overlaps much with the engineering design process, particularly if the new product being developed involves application of math and/or science. Every new product will pass through a series of stages/phases, including ideation among other aspects of design, as well as manufacturing and market introduction.  In highly complex engineered products (e.g. aircraft, automotive, machinery), the NPD process can be likewise complex regarding management of personnel, milestones, and deliverables.  Such projects typically use an integrated product team approach.  The process for managing large-scale complex engineering products is much slower (often 10-plus years) than that deployed for many types of consumer goods.

The product development process is articulated and broken down in many different ways, many of which often include the following phases/stages:
  Fuzzy front-end (FFE) is the set of activities employed before the more formal and well defined requirements specification is completed. Requirements speak to what the product should do or have, at varying degrees of specificity, in order to meet the perceived market or business need.
  Product design is the development of both the high-level and detailed-level design of the product:  which turns the what of the requirements into a specific how this particular product will meet those requirements. This typically has the most overlap with the engineering design process, but can also include industrial design and even purely aesthetic aspects of design. On the marketing and planning side, this phase ends at pre-commercialization analysis stage.
  Product implementation often refers to later stages of detailed engineering design (e.g. refining mechanical or electrical hardware, or software, or goods or other product forms), as well as test process that may be used to validate that the prototype actually meets all design specifications that were established.
  Fuzzy back-end or commercialization phase represent the action steps where the production and market launch occur.

The front-end marketing phases have been very well researched, with valuable models proposed. Peter Koen et al. provides a five-step front-end activity called front-end innovation: opportunity identification, opportunity analysis, idea genesis, idea selection, and idea and technology development. He also includes an engine in the middle of the five front-end stages and the possible outside barriers that can influence the process outcome. The engine represents the management driving the activities described. The front end of the innovation is the greatest area of weakness in the NPD process. This is mainly because the FFE is often chaotic, unpredictable and unstructured.
Engineering design is the process whereby a technical solution is developed iteratively to solve a given problem.
The design stage is very important because at this stage most of the product life cycle costs are engaged. Previous research shows that 70–80% of the final product quality and 70% of the product entire life-cycle cost are determined in the product design phase, therefore the design-manufacturing interface represent the greatest opportunity for cost reduction.
Design projects last from a few weeks to three years with an average of one year. Design and Commercialization phases usually start a very early collaboration. When the concept design is finished it will be sent to manufacturing plant for prototyping, developing a Concurrent Engineering approach by implementing practices such as QFD, DFM/DFA and more.
The output of the design (engineering) is a set of product and process specifications – mostly in the form of drawings, and the output of manufacturing is the product ready for sale. Basically, the design team will develop drawings with technical specifications representing the future product, and will send it to the manufacturing plant to be executed. Solving product/process fit problems is of high priority in information communication design because 90% of the development effort must be scrapped if any changes are made after the release to manufacturing.

Models
Conceptual models have been designed in order to facilitate a smooth process. 

 IDEO approach. The concept adopted by IDEO, a design and consulting firm, is one of the most researched processes in regard to new product development and is a five-step procedure. These steps are listed in chronological order:

 Understand and observe the market, the client, the technology, and the limitations of the problem;
 Synthesize the information collected at the first step;
 Visualise new customers using the product;
 Prototype, evaluate and improve the concept;
 Implementation of design changes, which are associated with more technologically advanced procedures and therefore will require more time

 BAH Model. One of the first developed models that today companies still use in the NPD process is the Booz, Allen and Hamilton (BAH) Model, published in 1982. This is the best known model because it underlies the NPD systems that have been put forward later. This model represents the foundation of all the other models that have been developed afterwards. Significant work has been conducted in order to propose better models, but in fact these models can be easily linked to BAH model. The seven steps of the BAH model are: new product strategy, idea generation, screening and evaluation, business analysis, development, testing, and commercialization. 
 Stage-gate model. A pioneer of NPD research in the consumers goods sector is Robert G. Cooper. Over the last two decades he conducted significant work in the area of NPD. The Stage-Gate model developed in the 1980s was proposed as a new tool for managing new products development processes.  This was mainly applied to the consumers goods industry. The 2010 APQC benchmarking study reveals that 88% of U.S. businesses employ a stage-gate system to manage new products, from idea to launch. In return, the companies that adopt this system are reported to receive benefits such as improved teamwork, improved success rates, earlier detection of failure, a better launch, and even shorter cycle times – reduced by about 30%. These findings highlight the importance of the stage-gate model in the area of new product development.
 Lean Start-up approach. Lean startup is a methodology for developing businesses and products that aims to shorten product development cycles and rapidly discover if a proposed business model is viable; this is achieved by adopting a combination of business-hypothesis-driven experimentation, iterative product releases, and validated learning. Lean startup emphasizes customer feedback over intuition and flexibility over planning. This methodology enables recovery from failures more often than traditional ways of product development. 
 Exploratory product development model. Exploratory product development, which often goes by the acronym ExPD, is an emerging approach to new product development. Consultants Mary Drotar and Kathy Morrissey first introduced ExPD at the 2015 Product Development and Management Association annual meeting and later outlined their approach in the Product Development and Management Association's magazine Visions. In 2015, their firm Strategy2Market received the trademark on the term "Exploratory PD".  Rather than going through a set of discrete phases, like the phase-gate process, exploratory product development allows organizations to adapt to a landscape of shifting market circumstances and uncertainty by using a more flexible and adaptable product development process for both hardware and software. Where the traditional phase-gate approach works best in a stable market environment, ExPD is more suitable for product development in markets that are unstable and less predictable. Unstable and unpredictable markets cause uncertainty and risk in product development. Many factors contribute to the outcome of a project, and ExPD works on the assumption that the ones that the product team doesn't know enough about or are unaware of are the factors that create uncertainty and risk. The primary goal of ExPD is to reduce uncertainty and risk by reducing the unknown. When organizations adapt quickly to the changing environment (market, technology, regulations, globalization, etc.), they reduce uncertainty and risk, which leads to product success. ExPD is described as a two-pronged, integrated systems approach. Drotar and Morrissey state that product development is complex and needs to be managed as a system, integrating essential elements: strategy, portfolio management, organization/teams/culture, metrics, market/customer understanding, and process.

Fuzzy front end 

The fuzzy front end (FFE) is the messy "getting started" period of new product engineering development processes. It is also referred to as the "Front End of Innovation", or "Idea Management".

It is in the front end where the organization formulates a concept of the product to be developed and decides whether or not to invest resources in the further development of an idea. It is the phase between first consideration of an opportunity and when it is judged ready to enter the structured development process (Kim and Wilemon, 2007; Koen et al., 2001).
It includes all activities from the search for new opportunities through the formation of a germ of an idea to the development of a precise concept. The Fuzzy Front End phase ends when an organization approves and begins formal development of the concept.

Although the fuzzy front end may not be an expensive part of product development, it can consume 50% of development time (see Chapter 3 of the Smith and Reinertsen reference below), and it is where major commitments are typically made involving time, money, and the product's nature, thus setting the course for the entire project and final end product. Consequently, this phase should be considered as an essential part of development rather than something that happens "before development", and its cycle time should be included in the total development cycle time.

Koen et al. (2001) distinguish five different front-end elements (not necessarily in a particular order):
 Opportunity Identification
 Opportunity Analysis
 Idea Genesis
 Idea Selection
 Idea and Technology Development
 The first element is the opportunity identification. In this element, large or incremental business and technological chances are identified in a more or less structured way. Using the guidelines established here, resources will eventually be allocated to new projects, which then leads to a structured NPPD (New Product & Process Development) strategy.
 The second element is the opportunity analysis. It is done to translate the identified opportunities into implications for the business and technology specific context of the company. Here extensive efforts may be made to align ideas to target customer groups and do market studies and/or technical trials and research.
 The third element is the idea genesis, which is described as evolutionary and iterative process progressing from birth to maturation of the opportunity into a tangible idea. The process of the idea genesis can be made internally or come from outside inputs, e.g. a supplier offering a new material/technology or from a customer with an unusual request.
 The fourth element is the idea selection. Its purpose is to choose whether to pursue an idea by analyzing its potential business value.
 The fifth element is the idea and technology development. During this part of the front-end, the business case is developed based on estimates of the total available market, customer needs, investment requirements, competition analysis and project uncertainty. Some organizations consider this to be the first stage of the NPPD process (i.e., Stage 0).

A universally acceptable definition for Fuzzy Front End or a dominant framework has not been developed so far.
In a glossary of PDMA, it is mentioned that the fuzzy front end generally consists of three tasks: strategic planning, idea generation, and pre-technical evaluation. These activities are often chaotic, unpredictable, and unstructured. In comparison, the subsequent new product development process is typically structured, predictable, and formal.
The term fuzzy front end was first popularized by Smith and Reinertsen (1991).
R.G. Cooper (1988)  it describes the early stages of NPPD as a four-step process in which ideas are generated (I), subjected to a preliminary technical and market assessment (II) and merged to coherent product concepts (III) which are finally judged for their fit with existing product strategies and portfolios (IV).

Other conceptualisations 
Other authors have divided predevelopment product development activities differently.

Phase zero of the Stage-Gate model of NPD
The Stage-Gate model of NPD predevelopment activities are summarised in Phase zero and one, in respect to earlier definition of predevelopment activities:

 Preliminary
 Technical assessment
 Source-of-supply assessment: suppliers and partners or alliances
 Market research: market size and segmentation analysis, VoC (voice of the customer) research
 Product idea testing
 Customer value assessment
 Product definition
 Business and financial analysis

These activities yield essential information to make a Go/No-Go to Development decision. These decisions represent the Gates in the Stage-Gate model.

Early phase of the innovation process 
A conceptual model of front-end process was proposed which includes early phases of the innovation process. This model is structured in three phases and three gates:

 Phase 1: Environmental screening or opportunity identification stage in which external changes will be analysed and translated into potential business opportunities.
 Phase 2: Preliminary definition of an idea or concept.
 Phase 3: Detailed product, project or service definition, and business planning.

The gates are:

 Opportunity screening
 Idea evaluation
 Go/No-Go for development

The final gate leads to a dedicated new product development project. Many professionals and academics consider that the general features of Fuzzy Front End (fuzziness, ambiguity, and uncertainty) make it difficult to see the FFE as a structured process, but rather as a set of interdependent activities ( e.g. Kim and Wilemon, 2002). However, Husig et al., 2005 [10] argue that front-end not need to be fuzzy, but can be handled in a structured manner.  In fact Carbone showed that when using the front end success factors in an integrated process, product success is increased. Peter Koen argues that in the FFE for incremental, platform and radical projects, three separate strategies and processes are typically involved. The traditional Stage Gate (TM) process was designed for incremental product development, namely for a single product. The FFE for developing a new platform must start out with a strategic vision of where the company wants to develop products and this will lead to a family of products. Projects for breakthrough products start out with a similar strategic vision, but are associated with technologies which require new discoveries.

Activity view on fuzzy-front end 
Predevelopment is the initial stage in NPD and consists of numerous activities, such as:

 product strategy formulation and communication
 opportunity identification and assessment
 idea generation
 product definition
 project planning
 executive reviews

Economical analysis, benchmarking of competitive products and modeling and prototyping are also important activities during the front-end activities.

The outcomes of FFE are the:

 mission statement
 customer needs
 details of the selected idea
 product definition and specifications
 economic analysis of the product
 development schedule
 project staffing and the budget
 business plan aligned with corporate strategy

Incremental, breakthrough, and platform products include:
 Incremental products are considered to be cost reductions, improvements to existing product lines, additions to existing platforms and repositioning of existing products introduced in markets.
 Breakthrough products are new to the company or new to the world and offer a 5–10 times or greater improvement in performance combined with a 30–50% or greater reduction in costs.
 Platform products establish a basic architecture for a next generation product or process and are substantially larger in scope and resources than incremental projects.

Management 
The quote "Innovate or die!" is widely attributed to Peter F Drucker, but this attribution has been disputed.

Customer-Centric NPD 
Customer-centric new product development focuses on finding new ways to solve customer problems and create more customer-satisfying experiences. Companies often rely on technology, but real success comes from understanding customer needs and values. The most successful companies were the ones that differentiated from others, solved major customer problems, offered a compelling customer value proposition, and engaged customers directly.

Systematic NPD 
Systematic new product development focuses on creating a process that allows for the collection, review, and evaluation of new product ideas. 

Having a way in which employees, suppliers, distributors, and dealers become involved in finding and developing new products is important to a company's success. It is also important for companies to have a process in place for monitoring the competition and their products so that they can stay ahead of the curve.

Innovation management 
In order to successfully manage the new product development process, companies must have an innovation management system in place. This system helps to ensure that all aspects of new product development are taken into account and that the company is able to track and assess the progress of new products. The innovation management system should also help to foster a culture of innovation within the company, which can help to increase the chances of success for new products.

Innovation manager 
An innovation manager is a senior person appointed to be responsible for implementing and managing the innovation management system. They are also responsible for ensuring that all aspects of new product development are taken into account and that the company is able to track and assess the progress of new products.

Cross-functional Innovation Management Committee 
A cross-functional innovation management committee is a team of individuals from different company departments, including marketing, engineering, design, manufacturing, and research and development, who are responsible for overseeing and managing the new product development process. This committee helps to ensure that all aspects of new product development are taken into account and that the company is able to track and assess the progress of new products. Companies may get a better overall picture of new product development by putting together a cross-functional team, which can help generate fresh ideas and give assistance in evaluating them.

NPD in turbulent times 
In difficult economic times, it is even more important for companies to focus on innovation and new product development. Oftentimes, such situations result in a short-sighted focus on cost-cutting and a reduction in spending on new products. However, companies that are able to innovate and create new products will be better positioned for the future.

Although counter-intuitive, tough times may even call for a greater emphasis on new product development. This is because companies need to find ways to meet the changing needs and tastes of their customers. Innovation can help a company become more competitive and better positioned for the future. In difficult economic times, it is even more important for companies to focus on innovation and new product development.

In addition, companies can use virtual product development to help reduce costs. Virtual product development uses collaboration technology to remove the need for co-located teams, which can result in significant cost savings such as a reduction in G&A (general & administrative) overhead costs of consulting firms.

Another way to reduce the cost of new product development is through the use of 24-hour development cycles. This approach allows companies to develop products more quickly and at a lower cost. By using a 24-hour cycle, companies can shorten the time it takes to get a product to market, which can give them a competitive advantage and capability that can be extremely useful in cases where there is a sudden change in market conditions or customer needs.

In difficult economic times, it is even more important for companies to focus on innovation and new product development. By using a variety of methods, such as virtual product development and 24-hour development cycles, companies can reduce the cost of new product development and improve their chances of success.

Product Development Roles 
There are many different roles in a product development team, however below is a list of some of the more common ones:

Related fields
 End user
 Brand management
 Engineering
 Industrial design
 Marketing
 Product management

See also
 Choice modelling
 Commercialization
 Conceptual economy
 Engineering information management
 Ideation (creative process)
 Industrial design
 Innovation
 Market penetration
 Open innovation
 Packaging
 Pro-innovation bias
 Product design
 Product lifecycle
 Requirements management
 Social design
 Soft launch

References

External links 

Beginnings
Design
 
Industrial design
Systems engineering